Šoltýska is a village and municipality in the Poltár District in the Banská Bystrica Region of Slovakia. The village is located in Slovenské rudohorie mountains. In Šoltýska had been sawmill and watermill in the past. Now the village is mostly touristic location with the chalets inside the village and its neighborhood, that use mostly city holidaymakers during the weekends.
In 2012 the village had been location of techno music festival SlovTek

.

References

External links
 
 
Artistic photo gallery of Šoltýska

Villages and municipalities in Poltár District